Toni Utunen (born 27 April 2000) is a Finnish professional ice hockey defenceman currently playing for Lahti Pelicans of the Finnish Liiga.

Playing Career
Utunen was drafted by the Vancouver Canucks in the fifth round, 130th overall in the 2018 NHL Entry Draft.

Following his fifth season in the Liiga with Tappara, Utunen left the club to sign a two-year contract with fellow Liiga outfit, Lahti Pelicans, on 20 May 2021.

International play

He scored the game-winning goal to eliminate Team Canada in the quarterfinals of the 2019 World Junior Ice Hockey Championships, in route to a gold medal. He also captained Team Finland to a gold medal in the 2018 IIHF World U18 Championships.

Career statistics

Regular season and playoffs

International

References

External links
 

2000 births
Living people
Finnish ice hockey defencemen
Lahti Pelicans players
Lempäälän Kisa players
Tappara players
Vancouver Canucks draft picks
Ice hockey players at the 2016 Winter Youth Olympics
People from Kokkola
Sportspeople from Central Ostrobothnia